Coed Coch, in Dolwen, Conwy, Wales, is a large 19th-century mansion in the neoclassical style, designed by the architect Henry Hakewill.  The building is Grade II* listed, as is its 18th- and 19th-century parkland.

The mansion is of ashlar, originally with two matching, three-bay elevations. At a diagonal, was a "remarkable" Greek Doric portico, with pediment.  This was removed in the early 20th century. The main elliptical staircase remains within a rotunda and lit by a small lantern dome.  The original parkland "survives in its entirety".  

The Coed Coch estate came to the Wynne family when the Rev. Richard Wynne married Gaynor, daughter and heiress of John Wynne of Coed Coch, in the parish of Betws yn Rhos. Their grandson, John Lloyd Wynne (1776–1887) undertook the enlargement of the house and estate in the early 19th century. The estate then descended in the male line until the death in World War I of Edward Henry John Wynne (1893–1916).  The estate was inherited by Margaret Broderick, his half-sister, who ran a famous Welsh Mountain Pony stud there that continued under her descendants until its sale in 1978.  

From the 1940s until the 1970s, the house was a boys' preparatory school, Heronwater School, under the headmastership of Keith Gaskell.  The estate is now a private home and is not open to the public. In 1996 the furniture from the library, commissioned by John Lloyd Wynne from Gillows of Lancaster in 1806–1807, was bought by the Museum of Welsh Life in Cardiff; it can now be seen in the library of St Fagans Castle.

Notes

References

External links

Grade II* listed buildings in Denbighshire
Grade II* listed houses
Country houses in Wales
Gardens in Wales
Registered historic parks and gardens in Conwy County Borough